{
  "type": "ExternalData",
  "service": "page",
  "title": "West and East Jersey Dividing Lines.map"
}
The Lawrence Line was a boundary line or partition line drawn through the Province of New Jersey during the colonial period, dividing it into the Province of West Jersey and the Province of East Jersey. The line was created by surveyor John Lawrence in 1743, and sought to offer final resolution to the division between the two proprietary colonies set out on the Quintipartite Deed (1676) which divided New Jersey by a straight line from "the Northernmost Branch of said Bay or River of De la Ware which is in forty-one Degrees and forty minutes of latitude…unto the most southwardly poynt of the East syde of Little Egge Harbour." Several previous surveys, including the Keith Line (1686), the Coxe–Barclay Line (1688), the Thornton Line (1696) were disputed and drawn too far west.  Lawrence was commissioned in 1743 to resolve the long-standing disputes.

Over a century later, in 1855, the New Jersey Supreme Court would adopt the Lawrence Line as the final arbiter in all property settlements in Cornelius and Empson v. Giberson, 25 N.J.L 1 (Sup. Ct. 1855).

Today, the legacy of the Lawrence line is extant in the boundaries of several New Jersey municipalities, including Walpack Township, Sandyston Township, Stillwater Township, Hampton Township, and Green Township in Sussex County in the northwestern region of the state.  In 1995, a group of surveyors attempted to plot the true coordinates of the line using GPS.

References

Pre-statehood history of New Jersey
History of the Thirteen Colonies
Borders of New Jersey
Eponymous border lines